Tektonargus is a trace fossil ichnotaxon genus of insect, from the Late Jurassic period. 

It was discovered in a section of the Morrison Formation, located in  Colorado, western North America.
The name Tektonargus comes from the Greek word Tēkton meaning artisan/craftsman and the Greek word Argus meaning "All Eyed."
It appears to have been created by a caddisfly.

See also

Late Jurassic insects
Morrison fauna
Trace fossils of North America
Jurassic Colorado